Georg Johansen (3 May 1924 – 4 July 1999) was a Norwegian gymnast. He competed in eight events at the 1952 Summer Olympics.

References

External links
 

1924 births
1999 deaths
Norwegian male artistic gymnasts
Olympic gymnasts of Norway
Gymnasts at the 1952 Summer Olympics
People from Sarpsborg
Sportspeople from Viken (county)
20th-century Norwegian people